AM1200 is a 2008 horror film directed by David Prior and starring Eric Lange, John Billingsley and Ray Wise.

Plot
It focuses on Sam Larson, an executive who is on the run after the suicide of his friend and co-conspirator in a scheme, Harry Jones. While driving along at night and trying to stay awake, Sam turns on his car radio to the A.M. band. While tuning through frequencies, he stops on 1200 kHz when he hears a call for help due to a medical emergency at radio station KBAL, transmitting from Mount Zaphon. He unwittingly drives to the radio station and when his car breaks down on the road, he ventures inside to use the telephone. There he finds a man handcuffed to a pole.

Production
Director David Prior had a background in producing DVDs of various films and documentaries for over ten years before writing and directing AM1200.

Screenings and release
AM1200 had its first screening on November 13, 2007 at the Arclight Cinemas in Hollywood. It was officially released on October 3, 2008 at the H.P. Lovecraft Film Festival.

Awards
The Brown Jenkin (won at the 2008 H.P. Lovecraft Film Festival).

References

External links

Monstermoviekid.wordpress.com "AM 1200 (2007) is well worth tracking down". Date: April 16, 2013. Retrieved December 19, 2013.
 

2008 films
2008 thriller films
Films directed by David Prior
Films with screenplays by David Prior
2000s English-language films